In mathematics, and more specifically number theory, the hyperfactorial  of a positive integer  is the product of the numbers of the form  from  to .

Definition
The hyperfactorial  of a positive integer  is the product of the numbers . That is,

Following the usual convention for the empty product, the hyperfactorial of 0 is 1.

Interpolation and approximation
The hyperfactorials were studied beginning in the 19th century by Hermann Kinkelin and James Whitbread Lee Glaisher. As Kinkelin showed, just as the factorials can be continuously interpolated by the gamma function, the hyperfactorials can be continuously interpolated by the K-function.

Glaisher provided an asymptotic formula for the hyperfactorials, analogous to Stirling's formula for the factorials:

where  is the Glaisher–Kinkelin constant.

Other properties
According to an analogue of Wilson's theorem on the behavior of factorials modulo prime numbers, when  is an odd prime number

where  is the notation for the double factorial.

The hyperfactorials give the sequence of discriminants of Hermite polynomials in their probabilistic formulation.

References

External links

Integer sequences
Factorial and binomial topics